Valencia is an unincorporated community and census-designated place (CDP) in Santa Fe County, New Mexico, United States. It was first listed as a CDP prior to the 2020 census.

The CDP is in eastern Santa Fe County, at the southern end of the Sangre de Cristo Mountains, and is bordered to the east by Glorieta. Interstate 25 passes through Valencia, with access from Exit 297. I-25 leads northwest (southbound)  to Santa Fe and east (northbound)  to Las Vegas, New Mexico. The highway crosses Glorieta Pass at the eastern border of the CDP.

Demographics

Education
It is within Santa Fe Public Schools.

It is zoned to El Dorado Community School (K-8) in El Dorado. Its high school is Santa Fe High School.

References 

Census-designated places in Santa Fe County, New Mexico
Census-designated places in New Mexico